Capensibufo is a genus of true toads commonly known as Cape toads or mountain toadlets. They are found in the Republic of South Africa from Breede River to north of Knysna, Western Cape Province.

Species
The following species are recognised in the genus Capensibufo:

Capensibufo deceptus   Deception Peak mountain toadlet
Capensibufo magistratus   Landdroskop mountain toadlet
Capensibufo rosei   Rose's mountain toad
Capensibufo selenophos   Moonlight mountain toadlet
Capensibufo tradouwi   Tradouw mountain toad

References

External links
  [web application]. 2008. Berkeley, California: Capensibufo. AmphibiaWeb, available at http://amphibiaweb.org/. (Accessed: May 1, 2008). 
  taxon Capensibufo at http://www.eol.org.
  Taxon Capensibufo at https://www.itis.gov/index.html. (Accessed: May 1, 2008).

 
Amphibian genera
Endemic amphibians of South Africa